I'll Carry You in My Arms is a 1943 German romance film directed by Kurt Hoffmann and starring Heli Finkenzeller, Hans Nielsen and Wolfgang Lukschy.

The film's sets were designed by the art director Hermann Liebig, Gabriel Pellon and Willy Schiller.

Cast
 Heli Finkenzeller as Karin Hartung
 Hans Nielsen as Dr. Hermnann Hartung
 Wolfgang Lukschy as Dr. Viktor Büchner
 Elisabeth Markus as Hedwig Wiegand
 Hans Leibelt as Hans Wiegand
 Ellen Bang as Frau Elvira
 Ilse Furstenberg as Dienstmädchen Lona
 Elsa Wagner as Frau Herbst
 Hansi Wendler as Helga Wiegand
 Ruth Lommel as Frau Sommer
 Eduard Wenck as Laborant Conrad
 John Pauls-Harding as Stefan Wiegand
 Rosi Wasinski as Fränzi
 Christa Dilthey as Fräulein Berg

References

Bibliography 
 Jill Nelmes & Jule Selbo. Women Screenwriters: An International Guide. Palgrave Macmillan, 2015.

External links 
 

1943 films
Films of Nazi Germany
German romance films
1940s romance films
1940s German-language films
Films directed by Kurt Hoffmann
German black-and-white films
Tobis Film films
1940s German films